Cyprinodontoidei is a suborder of fishes, one of the two suborders in the order Cyprinodontiformes. The Cyprinodontoidei consists of four superfamilies which are found in the Americas, the Mediterranean and in Africa, including Madagascar.

Classification
The Cyprinodontoidei is subdivided into superfamilies and families, which are:

 Superfamily Funduloidea Günther, 1866
 Family Profundulidae Hoedeman & Bronner, 1951
 Family Goodeidae Jordan & Gilbert, 1883
 Family Fundulidae Günther, 1866
 Superfamily Valencioidea Parenti, 1981
 Family Valenciidae Parenti, 1981
 Superfamily Cyprinodontoidea Wagner, 1828
 Family Cyprinodontidae Wagner, 1828
 Superfamily Poecilioidea Bonaparte, 1831
 Family Anablepidae Bonaparte, 1831
 Family Poeciliidae Bonaparte, 1831

References

Cyprinodontiformes
Taxa named by Lynne R. Parenti